William Anthony Waters (born 19 September 1931) is a Welsh former footballer who played as a goalkeeper. He made appearances in the English Football League with Wrexham and Millwall.

Career
Waters first signed for Blackpool in 1950, however, would make no appearances for them. This would also be the case for his next three clubs, signing for Stoke City, Southend United and Swansea Town, all without making an appearance for any of them.

His first professional appearances came with Wrexham, signing in 1955, where he would make 99 league appearances in the 5 years he spent there.

He would move to Millwall in 1960, where he would spend 1 season, making 5 appearances before moving to Yiewsley.

Career statistics
Source:

References

1931 births
Possibly living people
English Football League players
Association football goalkeepers
Blackpool F.C. players
Stoke City F.C. players
Southend United F.C. players
Swansea City A.F.C. players
Wrexham A.F.C. players
Millwall F.C. players
Hillingdon Borough F.C. players
Welsh footballers